Hindustan is an unincorporated community in Washington Township, Monroe County, in the U.S. state of Indiana.

History
Hindustan was platted on August 18, 1853, by Charles G. Carr. The community took its name after India (Hindustan) "...or a region of it."
Documents dating from the 1870s spell the town's name as 'Hindostan'.

Geography
It is within the Morgan Monroe State Forest.

References

Unincorporated communities in Monroe County, Indiana
Unincorporated communities in Indiana
Bloomington metropolitan area, Indiana